Altova is a commercial software development company with headquarters in Beverly, MA, United States and Vienna, Austria, that produces integrated XML, JSON, database, UML, and data management software development tools.

Company
Altova was founded in 1992 as an XML development software company. Its software is used by more than 4 million users and more than 100,000 companies globally. The first product was XMLSpy, and around the year 2000, Altova began to develop new tools to augment XMLSpy and expand into new areas of software development. The CEO and president of Altova is Alexander Falk, who has explained that the development of Altova software has occurred through the inclusion of features most requested by the users of previous program incarnations. Falk is also the inventor behind Altova's patents.

Altova software attempts to increase the efficiency of program use in order to reduce the amount of time needed for users to learn database software and other tasks such as query execution. Examples of Altova software includes the XML editor XMLSpy, and MapForce, a data mapping tool. Altova has also added XBRL capable programs to its XML software line, including development tools. In addition, they have included Web Services Description Language, project management and Unified Modeling Language capabilities to their software. Most recently, the company has introduced a mobile development environment called MobileTogether for developing cross-platform enterprise mobile solutions.

Programs
 XMLSpy—XML editor for modeling, editing, transforming, and debugging XML technologies
 MapForce—any-to-any graphical data mapping, conversion, and integration tool
 MapForce FlexText—graphical utility for parsing flat files
 StyleVision—multipurpose visual XSLT stylesheet design, multi-channel publishing, and report building tool
 UModel—UML modeling tool
 DatabaseSpy—multi-database data management, query, and design tool
 DiffDog—XML-aware file, directory, and database differencing tool
 SchemaAgent — graphical XML Schema, XSLT, WSDL and  management tool
 Authentic—WYSIWYG XML authoring tool and database content editor
 MissionKit—Altova's integrated suite of XML, SQL, and UML software tools
 MobileTogether—Cross-platform mobile development environment for native apps for the enterprise
 FlowForce Server—Server software for managing automation of business processes
 RaptorXML Server—XML and XBRL server with support for XML validation, XBRL validation, and XSLT and XQuery processing

Awards
Named to the SD Times 100 six times, including in 2010
 2009 Gartner Cool Vendor in Application Development
 2009 Visual Studio Magazine Readers Choice Award Winner
 2009 Windows IT Pro Magazine Editor's Best Developmental Tool, Silver Award
 2007 Windows IT Pro Magazine Best of Connections Award, Office Category
 2001, 2003, 2004, 2009, 2014 Jolt Product Excellence & Productivity Awards

See also
 XMLSpy

References

External links
 Altova Web site

Development software companies
Software companies of Austria